Felix Serafin (May 23, 1905 – August 9, 1966) was an American professional golfer.

Serafin was born in Wilkes-Barre, Pennsylvania. He made his living as a club professional while occasionally playing on the early PGA Tour, and won four times on tour.

Serafin's best finish in a major was a tie for sixth at the Masters Tournament in 1938. He also finished in a tie for ninth at the PGA Championship in 1939, then a match play event.

Professional wins

PGA Tour wins
1931 Pennsylvania Open Championship
1933 one win
1936 Pennsylvania Open Championship
1939 Hershey Open

Other wins
this list may be incomplete
1933 East Falls Open

References

American male golfers
PGA Tour golfers
Golfers from Pennsylvania
Sportspeople from Wilkes-Barre, Pennsylvania
1905 births
1966 deaths